Bermuda competed at the 1976 Summer Olympics in Montreal, Quebec, Canada.

Medalists

Athletics

Men
Track & road events

Field events

Women
Track & road events

Boxing

Men

Sailing

Open

References

External links
Official Olympic Reports
International Olympic Committee results database

Nations at the 1976 Summer Olympics
1976 Summer Olympics
1976 in Bermudian sport